Paul Silverthorne (born 1951 in Cheshire, England) is an English viola soloist and was principal violist of the London Symphony Orchestra and the London Sinfonietta.

Biography
Silverthorne studied at the Royal Academy of Music with Clarence Myerscough, Max Gilbert and Sidney Griller. In 1988, Silverthorne was made principal of the specialist contemporary music ensemble London Sinfonietta. In 1990, he started playing with the London Symphony Orchestra and appointed principal viola of the Orchestra the following year. In addition to his orchestral work, Paul Silverthorne is an active viola soloist and has performed with major English, American and European orchestras with conductors such as André Previn, Sir Colin Davis, Sir Simon Rattle, Sir John Eliot Gardiner and Kent Nagano.

Silverthorne is a specialist in contemporary music and has given many first performances both with the London Sinfonietta and in recitals. He has recorded for EMI, ASV, Chandos, Albany and Naxos.

Silverthorne is a professor of viola at the Royal Academy of Music (London), and plays a 17.7-inch (44.95 cm) 1620 Amati viola
loaned from the Royal Academy of Music. Since 2015, Silverthorne has taught at the newly founded school of music in Soochow University, in Suzhou, China.

References

External links 
 

1951 births
Living people
Academics of the Royal Academy of Music
English classical violists
Alumni of the Royal Academy of Music
London Symphony Orchestra players